Wetherby is an electoral ward of Leeds City Council in north east Leeds, West Yorkshire, covering the town of Wetherby and villages including Boston Spa, Bramham and Thorp Arch.

Boundaries 
The Wetherby ward includes the following civil parishes:
Boston Spa
Bramham cum Oglethorpe (Bramham Parish Council)
Clifford
Thorp Arch
Walton
Wetherby (Wetherby Town Council)

Councillors 

 indicates seat up for re-election.
 indicates seat up for election following resignation or death of sitting councillor.
* indicates incumbent councillor.

Elections since 2010

May 2022

May 2021

December 2019 by-election

May 2019

May 2018

May 2016

May 2015

May 2014

May 2012

May 2011

May 2010

Notes

References

Places in Leeds
Wards of Leeds